Belonidium may refer to:
 Belonidium Ehrenberg, 1854, fossil genus of Chromista, Bacillariophyceae 
 Belonidium Durieu de Maisonneuve, 1848, synonym of Lachnum Retzius, 1795, genus of fungi
 Belonidium (gastropod) Cossmann, 1892, a genus of gastropods; see Eulimella